Marshall Efron (February 3, 1938 – September 30, 2019) was an American actor and humorist originally known for his work on the listener-sponsored Pacifica radio stations WBAI New York and KPFK Los Angeles, and later for the PBS television show The Great American Dream Machine (the original showcase of Chevy Chase).

Career
At WBAI, Efron was a frequent guest on Steve Post's & Bob Fass's shows, along with left-wing/counter-culture figures such as Paul Krassner. One memorable broadcast had Efron and Krassner filling in for the vacationing Steve Post, and identifying themselves as Columbia University students who had taken the station over as part of the Columbia University protests of 1968. Although regular listeners were very familiar with the voices of Krassner and Efron, many listeners were not. NYPD officers responded three different times during the broadcast in response to reports from listeners who thought the "takeover" was a legitimate event. 
Efron also produced features such as A Satirical View.

Marshal Efron was the author of a number of children's works such as Bible Stories You Can't Forget: No Matter How Hard You Try.

He also starred in the irregularly-scheduled Sunday-morning television program Marshall Efron's Illustrated, Simplified, and Painless Sunday School on CBS from 1973 to 1977. In this show, Efron played all of the parts, including Adam, Eve, God and the Snake in the Garden of Eden, and the Three Wise Men in the story of Christmas.

Death
Efron died at the age of 81 on September 30, 2019, at the Lillian Booth Actors Home in Englewood, New Jersey.

Filmography

Animated roles
 The Kwicky Koala Show (1981) - Ratso (voice)
 Smurfs (1981-1982) - Sloppy Smurf (voice)
 Shirt Tales (1982) - (voice)
 The Biskitts (1983) - Mooch (voice)
 Kidd Video (1984-1985) - Fat Cat (voice)
 The 13 Ghosts of Scooby-Doo (1985) - Lousy Lizard (voice)
 Fluppy Dogs (1986) - Stanley (voice)
 The Transformers (1986-1987) - Hun-Gurrr (2nd Head) (voice)
 Snorks (1987-1988) - (voice)
 Time Squad (2002) - Earl of Sandwich (voice)

Film roles

 Funnyman (1967) - Sid, Photographer
 Pound (1970) - German Shepherd
 THX 1138 (1971) - TWA
 Doc (1971) - Mexican Bartender
 Is There Sex After Death? (1971) - Vince Domino
 Dynamite Chicken (1971) - Himself
 Bang the Drum Slowly (1973) - Bradley
 Blade (1973) - Fat man
 Baby Blue Marine (1976) - Cook
 The Faking of the President (1976) - Donald Segretti
 Why Me? (1978, Short) - Nesbit Spoon (voice)
 California Dreaming (1979) - Ruben
 Shogun Assassin (1980) - (voice)
 The First Time (1983) - Nick Rand
 Twice Upon a Time -  Botch (voice)
 Bad Manners (1984) - Cab Driver
 The Big Bang (1987) - Comrade in Chief (English version, voice)
 Talking Walls (1987) - Erwin
 The Road to Wellville (1994) - Bartholomew Bookbinder
 Cafe Society (1995) - Moe Persky
 Two Family House (2000) - Tiny
 A Piece of Eden (2000) - Andres
 Marie and Bruce (2004) - Ed
 Home on the Range (2004) - Larry the Duck (voice)
 Robots (2005) - Lamp Post / Toilet Bot / Bass Drum / Microphone (voice)
  Valiant (2005) - Additional Voice (voice)
 The Thing About My Folks (2005) - Tow Truck Driver
 Ice Age: The Meltdown (2006) - Start Dad (voice)
 Horton Hears a Who! (2008) - Wickersham Guard #1 / The Wickersham Brothers (voice)
 City Island (2009) - Actor-Dog
 Rob the Mob (2014) - Little Anthony (final film role)

Video game roles
 The Space Bar (1997) - (voice)

Theatrical roles
 Much Ado about Nothing Broadway 1972 - Singer

Discography
The Nutrino News Network, with Barton Heyman, Dennis Longwell and Marilyn Sokol. Polydor PD-5029 (1972)

References

External links
 

1938 births
2019 deaths
20th-century American male actors
21st-century American male actors
Male actors from Los Angeles
American children's writers
American humorists
American male film actors
American male stage actors
American male television actors
American male voice actors
American radio personalities
American television writers
Jewish American male actors
American male television writers
University of California, Berkeley alumni
University of California, Los Angeles alumni
21st-century American Jews